This is a list of main career statistics of Italian professional tennis player Jannik Sinner. All statistics are according to the ATP World Tour and ITF websites.

Performance timeline

{{Performance key|short=yes}}
Current through the 2023 Indian Wells Masters.

Significant finals

Masters 1000 tournaments

Singles: 1 (1 runner-up)

ATP career finals

Singles: 9 (7 titles, 2 runner-ups)

Doubles: 1 (1 title)

ATP Next Generation finals

Singles: 1 (1–0)

ATP Challenger and ITF Futures finals

Singles: 7 (5–2)

Doubles: 1 (1–0)

Record against other players

Record against top 10 players

Sinner's record against those who have been ranked in the top 10, with active players in boldface.

Record against players ranked No. 11–20

Active players are in boldface. 

  Alex de Minaur 4–0 
  Philipp Kohlschreiber 2–0
  Frances Tiafoe 2–1
  Borna Ćorić 1–0
  Kyle Edmund 2–0
  Cristian Garin 1–0
  Nick Kyrgios 1–0
  Reilly Opelka 1–0
  Guido Pella 1–0
  Albert Ramos Viñolas 1–0
  Aslan Karatsev 1–1
  Benoît Paire 1–1 

*

Wins over top 10 players
He has a  record against players who were, at the time the match was played, ranked in the top 10.

Notable exhibitions

Singles

References

Sinner, Jannik